The K. Hovnanian Children's Hospital (KHCH) at Jersey Shore University Medical Center is a pediatric acute care hospital located in Neptune Township, New Jersey. The hospital has 88 beds and provides comprehensive pediatric specialties and subspecialties to infants, children, teens, and young adults aged 0–21 throughout Coastal New Jersey. It is affiliated with both the Hackensack Meridian School of Medicine at Seton Hall University and Robert Wood Johnson Medical School, and is a member of Hackensack Meridian Health. KHCH features the only pediatric trauma center in the region, and 1 of 3 in the state. KHCH also partners with Ocean Medical Center, Riverview Medical Center, Southern Ocean Medical Center, and Bayshore Medical Center to provide pediatric care to the entire surrounding region of Hackensack Meridian Health hospitals.

About 
In 2006, the hospital became the first hospital in the Jersey Shore region to be designated as a children's hospital by the state.

In 2008, the hospital added a teen lounge, a new nurses station, additional pediatric rooms, and updated designs and architecture throughout.

KHCH was named after builder Kevork Hovnanian after his foundation contributed the "largest donation the hospital had seen in its 101 year history." The hospital features an ACS regional pediatric trauma center, 1 of 3 in New Jersey and the only in the region. The hospital also has an AAP verified level 3 neonatal intensive care unit, the highest in the Jersey Shore region.

In 2012 and 2017, it was listed as a Nurse Magnet hospital by the ANCC. In 2019, the hospital received the prestigious International Board Certified Lactation Consultant certification and provides a location for mothers to breastfeed. In 2020, the hospital ranked #44 nationally in the field of Pediatric Cancer by U.S. News & World Report. In 2020–21, it ranked #42 nationally, and in 2021 it ranked in the top 50 nationally for pediatric cancer care .

In May 2019 administration of KHCH announced a renovation of the pediatric emergency department at the hospital. The renovations completed in June 2020, with upgrades including a better child-friendly environment with new signage and floors, warm and playful colors, colorful furnishings, and wall decals depicting outdoor scenes.

Patient Care Units 
The hospital offers a variety of settings for pediatric patients ranging from critical care to inpatient care to outpatient care.

 10 - 12 bed pediatric emergency department
 30 bed neonatal intensive care unit
 10 bed pediatric intensive care unit
 44 bed general pediatric inpatient unit

Services 
KHCH offers over 50 pediatric services and sub-specialties to patients aged 0–21 throughout the Jersey Shore region.

Pediatric Cancer Care
 Pediatric Emergency Department
 Pediatric Neurology
 Pediatric Nutrition and Gastroenterology
 Pediatric Orthopedics
 Pediatric Services
 Pediatric Surgical Services
 Pediatric Therapy
Pediatric Urology

See also 

 List of children's hospitals in the United States
 Joseph M. Sanzari Children's Hospital
 Hackensack Meridian Health
Bristol Myers Squibb Children's Hospital

References

External links 

 K. Hovnanian Children's Website
 Hackensack Meridian Health 

Hospitals in New Jersey
Neptune Township, New Jersey
Hospitals in Monmouth County, New Jersey
Children's hospitals in the United States
Children's hospitals in New Jersey
Pediatric trauma centers